SS Empire Cobbett was a  tanker which was built in 1942 by Furness Shipbuilding Co Ltd, Haverton Hill-on-Tees for the Ministry of War Transport (MoWT). In 1946 she was sold into merchant service and renamed San Wilfrido. She was scrapped in 1959.

Description
The ship was built by Furness Shipbuilding Co Ltd, Haverton Hill-on-Tees, as yard number 350. She was launched on 19 November 1942 and completed in December 1942.

She had a GRT of 9,811 and a NRT of 5,779.

The engine was built by Richardsons, Westgart & Co Ltd, Hartlepool.

History
Empire Cobbett was built for the MoWT, who placed her under the management of Eagle Oil and Shipping Company Ltd, Middlesbrough. Her port of registry was Middlesbrough. The Code Letters BFFN and United Kingdom Official Number 164861 were allocated.

Empire Cobbett was a member of a number of convoys during the Second World War.

HX 249
Convoy HX 249 sailed from New York City on 23 July 1943 and reached Liverpool on 6 August. Empire Cobbett was bound for Avonmouth, Somerset.

HX 255
Convoy HX 255 departed New York on 2 September 1943 and arrived at Liverpool on 16 September. Empire Cobbett was bound for Stanlow Refinery, Ellesmere Port.

HX 313
Convoy HX 313 departed New York on 10 October 1944 and arrived at Liverpool on 24 October 1944. Empire Cobbett was due to have joined this convoy, bound for Milford Haven, Pembrokeshire.

In 1946 Empire Cobbett was sold to Eagle Oil & Shipping Co Ltd, London, who renamed her San Wilfrido and changed her port of registry to London. Her name came from an earlier , which had been launched for Eagle Oil in 1914 and sunk by a mine that same year.

She served until 1959, arriving on 10 November at Hong Kong for scrapping.

References

External links
Photo of Empire Cobbett

1942 ships
Ships built on the River Tees
Tankers of the United Kingdom
Steamships of the United Kingdom
Ministry of War Transport ships
Empire ships
World War II tankers
Merchant ships of the United Kingdom